Schistura shadiwalensis is a species of ray-finned fish, a stone loach, in the genus Schistura from Pakistan.

References

S
Fish described in 1981
Taxa named by Teodor T. Nalbant